At least two warships of Japan have been named Makishio:

, an  launched in 1971 and struck in 1988.
, an  launched in 1999

Japanese Navy ship names
Japan Maritime Self-Defense Force ship names